is a town located in Nagano Prefecture, Japan. , the town had an estimated population of 4,616 in 2058 households, and a population density of 38 persons per km².

Geography
Located at the southern tip of Nagano Prefecture, Anan is surrounded by the Japanese Alps. The center of the town located on the right bank of the Tenryū River.

Climate
The town has a climate characterized by hot and humid summers, and cold winters (Köppen climate classification Cfa).  The average annual temperature in Anan is 11.7 °C. The average annual rainfall is 2023 mm with September as the wettest month. The temperatures are highest on average in August, at around 23.6 °C, and lowest in January, at around -0.0 °C.

Surrounding municipalities
Nagano Prefecture
Urugi
 Shimojō
 Tenryū
 Achi
Hiraya
 Yasuoka
Aichi Prefecture
Toyone

Demographics 
Per Japanese census data, the population of Ana has been declining over the past 70 years.

History
The area of present-day Anan was part of ancient Shinano Province. The modern town was established on July 1, 1957 by the merger of the villages of Oshimojo, Wago and Asage.

Education
Anan has four public elementary schools and two public junior high schools operated by the town government. The town has one public high school operated by the Nagano Prefectural Board of Education.

Transportation

Railway
The town does not have any passenger railway service.

Highway

References

External links
 
Official Website 

 
Towns in Nagano Prefecture